Since May 2019, the Northern Cape Provincial Legislature, legislature of the Northern Cape province of South Africa, has consisted of 30 members from 4 different political parties, elected on 8 May 2019 in the 2019 South African general election. The ruling African National Congress (ANC) retained its majority by earning a total of 18 members, a loss of two seats from the previous legislature. The official opposition Democratic Alliance (DA) holds 8 seats, one more than it held in the previous legislative session. The Economic Freedom Fighters (EFF) occupy 3 seats, a gain of one from the previous election. The Freedom Front Plus (FF+) managed to win a seat in the legislature for the first time since 2004.

Members of the Provincial Legislature (MPLs) are elected through a system of party-list proportional representation with closed lists. This means that each voter casts a vote for one political party, and seats in the legislature are assigned to the parties in proportion to the number of votes they received. The seats are then filled by members by lists acceded by the parties before the election.

Members of the 6th Provincial Legislature took office on 22 May 2019. During the first sitting, Newrene Klaaste was elected the new Speaker with Mangaliso Matika as the new Deputy Speaker, while Zamani Saul was elected Premier. They are all members of the ANC. Andrew Louw of the DA retained the role of Leader of the Opposition.

Current composition

This is a graphical comparison of party strengths as they are in the 6th Northern Cape Provincial Legislature.

Note this is not the official seating plan of the Northern Cape Provincial Legislature.

|-style="background:#e9e9e9;"
!colspan="2" style="text-align:left"| Party !! style="text-align:center"| Seats 
|-
|  || 18
|-
|  || 8
|-
|  || 3
|-
|  || 1 
|-
|colspan="2" style="text-align:left"| Total || style="text-align:right"| 30
|}

Members

See also
List of members of the 5th Northern Cape Provincial Legislature

References

External links
Members of the Provincial Legislature – Northern Cape Provincial legislature (NCPL)

Legislature